Calvin Luk is an Australian automotive designer working for BMW AG. He is one of the youngest exterior designers for BMW group. He has worked for BMW since 2008.

Luk is an Australian of Hong Kong descent. He got his automotive inspiration from his parents' E36 BMW 3 series. He also gets inspiration from listening to Nickelback.

Education 

Calvin studied first at the University of Technology Sydney before applying to the prestigious  Art Center College of Design in Pasadena after getting advice from a BMW executive. He majored in transportation design.

Notable Work 
Luk is known for his work on the BMW X1 F48 design, the BMW 1 Series F20 LCI exterior design, the BMW X3 G01 exterior design, and the BMW Z4 Concept.

References 

BMW designers
Living people
University of Technology Sydney alumni
Art Center College of Design alumni
1985 births